Paravilla mercedis is a species in the family Bombyliidae ("bee flies"), in the order Diptera ("flies").

References

Further reading

External links
Diptera.info

mercedis
Insects described in 1887